As a nickname, Viking or The Viking may refer to:

People nicknamed The Viking 
 Erik Lund, a former Norwegian rugby union player.
 Andy Fordham, an English professional darts player.

See also 

 Techno Viking

Lists of people by nickname